Udangudi is a Panchayat town in Thoothukudi district in the Indian state of Tamil Nadu.

Demographics
 India census, Udangudi had a population of 19,738. Males constitute 49.92% of the population and females 50.07%. Udangudi has an average literacy rate of 93.18%, very much higher than the state average of 80.09%: male literacy is 95.08%, and female literacy is 91.30%.

Udangudi in British rule had railway line connected to Tiruchendur.  This railway line was laid primarily to take advantage of collecting the Palm Juice extraction  going around Udangudi and British established a Jaggery Factory near Kulasekaran pattinam for export market.    Unfortunately, the factory became non-operational which resulted in non-usage of this railway line.

The town is an example of peaceful co-existence with population of Muslims, Christians and Hindus distributed in equal proportions and the entire people live in harmony.

T.D.T.A.Higher Secondary School is the oldest school for boys, Mary Ann Best Higher Secondary School for girls  from which most people got educated and One more School Sri. Ramakrishna Chidhambareshwarer. Hr.Sec.School (Sri.R.K.C) is also there and there is most famous schools are there like St. Antony's RC Middle School, Saiva Prakasa Vidyasalai School, Anitha Kumaran Matric. Higher Secondary School. Najath School and Salma School etc.

Centre for Karuppatti
Years back Udangudi and its suburbs had a lot of  Palmyrah groves, where  the main occupation was to extract Palm Juice and prepare Karuppukatti or KarpagaKatti (Palm Jaggery, presumably karuppukatti is a transformed form for "Karumbukatti" sugar(cane)piece). More than a century back this centre was the place which catered to the Palm Jaggery requirements to the demands of South India and also Palm Jaggery requirements to several other countries where it was exported.

Origin of name
The name Udangudi might have been derived from two Tamil words. "Udai" means the thorny tree (Acacia planifrons) which is abundant in that area. "Kudi" refers to a village or a human settlement. The two words when joined together its pronounced as "Udangudi".

Some people told this is the village having equal number of Hindu, Christian and Muslims. They lived here with a close relationship. So it named as 'Udangudi'.

Economy

BHEL power plant
2x660 MW, Stage-I LOA issued to M/s BHEL for Design, Engineering, Manufacture, Supply, erection, testing and commissioning of complete 2x660MW coal based Supercritical thermal power project, Udangudi Stage I, on Engineering, Procurement and Construction basis for a value of Rs.7359 crores on 7.12.17.

References

 http://www.udangudipower.com/

Cities and towns in Thoothukudi district